The Sunkoshi, also spelt Sunkosi, is a river of Nepal that is part of the Koshi or Saptkoshi River system in Nepal. Sunkoshi has two source streams, one that arises within Nepal in Choukati, and the other more significant stream that flows in from Nyalam County in the Tibet region of China. The latter is called Bhote Koshi in Nepal and Matsang Tsangpo in Tibet. Due to the significant flows from Bhote Koshi, the Sun Koshi river basin is often regarded as a trans-border river basin.

River course

The Sunkoshi's headwaters are located in the Zhangzangbo Glacier in Tibet.

The Indravati meets the Sunkoshi at Dolaghat, up to where it is followed by the Arniko Rajmarg. From there, the Sunkoshi flows eastwards through the valley formed between the Mahabharat Range and the Himalayas. Tamakosi, Likhu, Dudhkosi, Arun and Tamor are its left tributaries and Indravati is the right tributary.

The average annual flow is 2.2 x 1010 m3. The average sediment load is 5.4 x 107 m3.

The Tamur and the Arun rivers join the Sunkoshi at Tribenighat to form the Saptkoshi, which flows through the Chatra Gorge across the Mahabharat Range on to the Gangetic plain.
There are few more smaller tributaries of the Sunkoshi such as Rosi Khola, Junga Khola, and Sapsu Khola.

Names and etymology

In Nepali language, the word "sun" means gold and golden; and the word "kosi" means river.

Koshi River system
The Koshi River drains eastern Nepal. It is also known as Saptkoshi River because of the seven rivers joining in east-central Nepal to form this river. The main rivers forming the Koshi River system are Sunkoshi, Indravati, Tamba Koshi, Bhote Koshi, Dudh Kosi, Arun and Tamur Rivers. The Saptkoshi River flows through the Chatra Gorge in a southerly direction into northern Bihar and joins the Ganges.

The Sunkoshi contributes about 44% of the total water of the Saptakoshi, the Arun 37% and the Tamur 19%.

Infrastructures
It was proposed to divert the water from a small weir across the river near Kurule through a  tunnel and a 61.4 MW associated power house to the Kamala River, flowing through central Nepal. Some  of water would be transferred to the Kamala River for the purposes of irrigation and further generation of power.

Hazards 
In July 1981, a sudden ice avalanche caused a Glacial Lake Outburst Flood in the moraine-dammed Zhangzangbu-Cho Lake in the headwaters of the Poiqu in Tibet. The ensuing debris flow destroyed bridges, and sections of both the Arniko and the Nepal–China highways.

On 2 August 2014, a landslide at Jure blocked the river downstream from Barabise and created a large lake that submerged a hydropower station. This huge rockslide of approximately  blocked the Sunkoshi River upstream of Jure village. This landslide killed approximately 155 people, destroyed approximately 120 houses completely and 37 partially. The area has been declared a flood crisis zone, and local communities are evacuated. Power supply was interrupted, and the Arniko Highway blocked.

Water sports
The Sunkoshi is used for both rafting and intermediate kayaking. It has grade III-IV rapids.

The first successful descent of the Sunkoshi was made in late September 1970 by Daniel C. Taylor, Terry Bech, Cheri Bremer-Kamp, and Carl Schiffler. They entered the river at Dolaghat and exited at the Nepal-India border. Their expedition took four days. Prior to this successful trip, there are four known unsuccessful attempts to descend the river, and one unsuccessful attempt to ascend the river in a jet boat under the leadership of Edmund Hillary.

Notes

References

External links
 Sun Kosi River, OpenStreetMap, retrieved 19 December 2021.
 Bhote Kosi River (Upper Sun Kosi), OpenStreetMap, retrieved 19 December 2021.
 Arun River, OpenStreetMap, retrieved 19 December 2021.
 Sapta Kosi River, OpenStreetMap, retrieved 19 December 2021.

Rivers of Koshi Province
Rivers of Tibet
International rivers of Asia